Levar Marcus Stoney (born March 20, 1981) is an American politician from the Commonwealth of Virginia and the 80th mayor of Richmond, Virginia. He served as the Secretary of the Commonwealth of Virginia from 2014 through 2016, the youngest member of Governor Terry McAuliffe's administration.

Early and personal life
Stoney was born on Long Island, New York. When he was seven years old, he moved with his younger brother to Virginia's Hampton Roads area. His parents never married; Stoney and his siblings were raised by their father (who supported the family via various low-wage jobs, and eventually became a high school janitor) and grandmother (a retired domestic worker).

At Tabb High School in Tabb, Virginia, Stoney became quarterback on the school's football team, and also president of the student body (as he had in elementary and middle school). Stoney graduated from James Madison University in Harrisonburg, Virginia, in 2004. He was the first African-American male elected president of the student government, and involved with the school's chapter of the College Democrats.

In 2016, Stoney divorced his wife of four years. He became engaged to Brandy Washington, a manager for Altria on February 22, 2022. They married almost exactly a year later, on February 23, 2023.

Career
In the summer of 2004, Stoney served as a Governor's Fellow in Mark Warner's administration. Stoney then worked as an organizer in John Kerry's 2004 presidential campaign as well as for the Democratic National Committee and the Democratic Party of Wisconsin in a get out the vote effort. Five of his colleagues were later charged with slashing the tires of a van meant to be used to drive Republican voters to the polls. Stoney initially lied to police claiming he had no knowledge about the incident. He later admitted to FBI investigators that he was present in the Democratic campaign offices after his colleagues came in to brag about slashing the tires. Stoney then went on to testify against his colleagues and fully cooperated with law enforcement. After questioning during a committee meeting with Virginia Republican lawmakers about his indiscretion, it was accepted as "an isolated, youthful mistake."

During the 2005 Virginia Attorney General election Stoney worked for Creigh Deeds, who narrowly lost. Stoney then worked for the Democratic Party of Virginia from 2006 to 2009, first as political director and then executive director. In this role, he worked extensively with President Barack Obama's successful 2008 presidential campaign.

In 2011, after losing his father, who (with his grandmother) had supported his political involvement (and after Creigh Deeds lost the 2009 Virginia gubernatorial race to Republican Bob McDonnell), Stoney began working as a consultant at Green Tech, an automotive company run by Terry McAuliffe (who had lost to Deeds in the 2009 Democratic gubernatorial primary). The following year Stoney began working with McAuliffe's 2013 gubernatorial campaign, as deputy campaign manager, under campaign manager Robby Mook. When McAuliffe won, Stoney became deputy director of the gubernatorial transition team, during which McAuliffe described Stoney as his "closest adviser."

McAuliffe appointed Stoney as Secretary of the Commonwealth of Virginia on November 18, 2013. Following confirmation by the Virginia General Assembly, he took office on January 17, 2014.

As Secretary of the Commonwealth, Stoney championed efforts for the restoration of voting rights for felons who have completed their sentences, an effort begun under Governor Bob McDonnell and accelerated under Governor McAuliffe. Stoney said that "once you have served your time and paid your due, we still should not be punishing you years afterwards. Instead, we should find ways to give that individual an opportunity to better themselves and to contribute to society."

Mayor of Richmond

Dwight Clinton Jones could not run for re-election as Mayor of Richmond because of a two-term limit. Stoney became a candidate in the 2016 election to succeed him, announcing his candidacy after resigning as Secretary of the Commonwealth.

Stoney won the election over Jack Berry, 36% to 34%, with Joe Morrissey in third place. Shortly after the election, Mayor-elect Stoney named Tiffany Jana and Bill Leighty as co-chairs of his transition team, with University of Richmond professor Thad Williamson named as director.

Stoney was sworn into office on December 31, 2016. At 35 years of age, he became Richmond's youngest elected mayor. In March 2019 Mayor Stoney proposed a nine-cent per $100 assessed value real estate tax hike. He also proposed adding a 50-cent tax on packages of cigarettes.

In 2021, Stoney proclaimed April 17th as "Giles B. Jackson Day" for all of Giles B. Jackson's accomplishments, and it was awarded on the 150th anniversary of the historic Jackson Ward neighborhood.

In January 2022, Stoney was elected as President of the Democratic Mayors Alliance, a national Democratic Party coalition dedicated to electing Democratic Mayors. Stoney thus serves as a member of the Democratic National Committee. Stoney was previously on the board of the organization, and filled the vacancy left by Los Angeles Mayor Eric Garcetti, whom President Joe Biden has nominated to serve as Ambassador to India.

Tear-gassing incident
In June 2020, in response to the murder of George Floyd, a protest assembled in Richmond at the Robert E. Lee Statue on Monument Avenue. Police responded by tear gassing the crowd before curfew and without warning. The response was widespread in its criticism of law enforcement officers and local government, including Stoney. The police initially issued a statement defending their use of tear gas, stating: "To our peaceful protestors:  We are sorry we had to deploy gas near the Lee Monument. Some RPD officers in that area were cut off by violent protestors. The gas was necessary to get them to safety." However, after video footage from several people at the protests was released which contradicted the police's statement showing no signs of violence, the police responded with a tweet apologizing for tear gassing the crowd of peaceful protesters, stating that the Chief of police "apologizes for this unwarranted action. These officers have been pulled from the field. They will be disciplined because their actions were outside dept protocols and directions given." Stoney responded by showing up to another protest, apologizing to the crowd for violating their rights.

Electoral history

References

External links

|-

1981 births
Living people
Politicians from Nassau County, New York
People from York County, Virginia
Mayors of Richmond, Virginia
African-American mayors in Virginia
African-American state cabinet secretaries
James Madison University alumni
Secretaries of the Commonwealth of Virginia
Virginia Democrats
20th-century African-American people
21st-century African-American politicians
21st-century American politicians
Tabb High School alumni